George Irvin Stultz (June 30, 1873 – March 19, 1955) was a professional baseball player.  He was a pitcher for one season (1894) with the Boston Beaneaters.  He made only one major league appearance, pitching a complete-game victory, giving up no earned runs.  For his career, he compiled a 1–0 record, with a 0.00 earned run average, and 1 strikeout in 9 innings pitched.

He was born and later died in Louisville, Kentucky at the age of 81.

External links

1873 births
1955 deaths
19th-century baseball players
Boston Beaneaters players
Major League Baseball pitchers
Baseball players from Louisville, Kentucky
Shreveport Giants players
Montgomery Black Sox players
Montgomery Senators players
Memphis Egyptians players
Birmingham Barons players
Jacksonville Jays players
Newark Colts players
Savannah (minor league baseball) players